This is a list of records from the Superbike World Championship.

Updated at October 14, 2019.

Single season records

Most wins in a single season

Most podium finishes in a single season

Most pole positions in a single season

Most fastest laps in a single season

Riders who won in their first season or as a wildcard in their first race

Career records

Most championships

Most career wins

Most career podium finishes

References

World Superbike
records

de:Superbike-WM
fr:Championnat du monde de Superbike
fr:Liste des champions du monde Superbike
id:Superbike World Championship
it:Campionato mondiale Superbike
hu:Superbike világbajnokság
hu:Superbike-világbajnokok listája
ja:スーパーバイク世界選手権